Zodarion soror is a spider species found in Corsica.

See also 
 List of Zodariidae species

References

External links 

soror
Spiders of Europe
Spiders described in 1873